Karey Hanks is an American politician from Idaho. Hanks was a Republican member of Idaho House of Representatives for District 35, seat B.

Early life and education 
Hanks was born in Idaho Falls, Idaho and graduated from Idaho Falls High School. In 2011, Hanks earned a degree in psychology from Brigham Young University–Idaho.

Career 
Hanks was a bus driver for the Fremont County School District. On November 8, 2016, Hanks won the election unopposed and became a Republican member of Idaho House of Representatives for District 35, seat B.

Hanks the Republican nominee for her old seat in the Idaho House of Representatives in the 2020 election. Hanks is running unopposed in the November general election.

In October 2020, Hanks appeared in a video produced by the Idaho Freedom Foundation. Alongside Lieutenant Governor Janice McGeachin and other state legislators, Hanks criticized Governor Brad Little and stated, "The fact that a pandemic may or may not be occurring changes nothing about the meaning or intent of the state constitution and the preservation of our inalienable rights."

Personal life 
Hanks' husband is Burke. They have seven children. Hanks and her family lives in St. Anthony, Idaho.

References

External links 
 Karey Hanks at ballotpedia.org
 kareyhanks.com

Brigham Young University–Idaho alumni
Living people
Republican Party members of the Idaho House of Representatives
People from Idaho Falls, Idaho
People from St. Anthony, Idaho
Women state legislators in Idaho
Year of birth missing (living people)